The 1950 World Archery Championships was the 14th edition of the event. It was held in Copenhagen, Denmark on 26–30 July 1950 and was organised by World Archery Federation (FITA).

In the men's individual competition, Hans Deutgen won his fourth straight championship, a record which remains unbroken. Uponn being presented with his gold medal, he passed it to the third place Russ Reynolds, who was suffering from leukemia.

Medals summary

Recurve

Medals table

References

External links
 World Archery website
 Complete results
 British Pathe newsreel footage

World Championship
World Archery
Arch
World Archery Championships